The thick-lipped pebblesnail, scientific name Somatogyrus crassilabris, was a species of freshwater snail with an operculum, an aquatic gastropod mollusk in the family Hydrobiidae, the mud snails. This species was endemic to the United States. Its natural habitat was rivers. It is now extinct.

References

Somatogyrus
Extinct gastropods
Taxonomy articles created by Polbot